Jiří Družecký (also known as Giorgio Druschetzky, also Druzechi, Druzecky, Druschetzki, Držecky, Truschetzki; 7 April 1745, Jemníky – 21 June 1819, Budapest) was a Czech composer, oboist, and timpanist.

Life and career
Druschetzky studied oboe with the noted oboist and composer Carlo Besozzi in Dresden. He then joined the band of an infantry regiment in Eger, with which he was later stationed (sequentially) in Vienna, Enns, Linz, and Branau. In 1777 he was certified as a drummer. In 1783 he moved to Vienna, where he became a member of the Tonkünstler-Sozietät. Three years later he was Kapellmeister for Anton Grassalkovič of Gyaraku and moved to Bratislava.

It is believed he started writing music in the 1770s, most of it for his band. He also wrote chamber music and music for orchestra, including 27 symphonies and concertos for various instruments. A couple of his operas survive, but a suite of incidental music and a ballet are known to be lost. Druschetzky is credited with one of the earliest uses of the BACH motif. Druschetzky died in Buda.

Selected compositions
Stage
 Mechmet, Opera
 Zemira, Opera
 Perseus and Andromeda, Incidental music to the play
 Inkle and Yariko, Ballet

Orchestral
 Concerto in B major for oboe and orchestra
 Concerto in C major for oboe and orchestra
 Concerto in F major for oboe and orchestra
 Concerto for 6 timpani and orchestra
 Concerto in D major for viola and orchestra; The solo viola part is written in the key of C major requiring a scordatura tuning a whole step higher.
 Gran Sinfonia in C major
 Harmonia – for 21 wind instruments (1790)
 Partita in C major for timpani and chamber orchestra Partita in F major Sinfonia alla battaglia for string and brass orchestra
 Sinfonia in CChamber music
 Quartet for bassethorn, violin, viola and cello Quintet in F major for horn, violin, 2 violas and cello (1810)
 Sextet for 2 clarinets, 2 horns and 2 bassoons 6 Sonatas for solo violin and basso continuo, Op. 1 (Linz, 1783)
 Sonata for mandolin and bass in G 
 String Quartet No. 1 String Quartet No. 2 String Quartet No. 3 in D major Trio for 3 bassethorns

Choral
 Missa solemnis for soloists, mixed chorus and orchestra (1804)

Discography
Some of Druschetzky's music has been recorded on the Naxos Records label, such as his Timpani Concerto on a disc titled Virtuoso Timpani Concertos. All Parthias have been recorded on the Aulia Label by I Fiati Italiani.

The first complete recording of Druschetzky's Divertissement for three basset horns was recorded on the Hevhetia label by Lotz Trio ensemble. Four of his Quartets for oboe, violin, viola & cello (F major, G minor, E flat major, and C major) are recorded on Georg Druschetzky: Oboe Quartets on the Hungaroton Classic label, and a selection of his wind music (Amphion Wind Octet) on the ACCENT label.

References

Further reading
 Alexander Weinman & Damian A. Frame, "Druschetzky, Georg" in The New Grove Dictionary of Music and Musicians'', ed. Stanley Sadie. New York: Macmillan Publishers Limited (2001): 7 617 – 618

External links
 

1745 births
1819 deaths
Czech male classical composers
Czech Classical-period composers
Austrian male classical composers
Czech classical oboists
Male oboists
Austrian classical composers
Austrian people of Czech descent
People from Kladno District
Timpanists
19th-century Czech male musicians